Phaeoisariopsis bataticola is a fungal plant pathogen infecting sweet potatoes.

References

External links 
 Index Fungorum
 USDA ARS Fungal Database

Fungal plant pathogens and diseases
Root vegetable diseases
Mycosphaerellaceae
Fungi described in 1976